End of the Line or The End of the Line may refer to:

In railway terminology, a train station at the end, or terminus, of a rail line

Music 
 End of the Line (album), a box set by The Klinik
 "End of the Line" (Honeyz song)
 "End of the Line" (Traveling Wilburys song)
 "End of the Line", a song by The Allman Brothers Band from Shades of Two Worlds
 "End of the Line", a song by Arch Enemy from Anthems of Rebellion
 "End of the Line", a song by Boy & Bear from Harlequin Dream
 "End of the Line", a song by Concrete Blonde from Mexican Moon
 "End of the Line", a song by DevilDriver from The Fury of Our Maker's Hand
 "End of the Line", a song by Frijid Pink
 "End of the Line", a song by Frozen Ghost from Frozen Ghost
 "End of the Line", a song by J. J. Cale from Travel-Log
 "The End of the Line", a song by Metallica from Death Magnetic
 "End of the Line", a song by Negative
 "The End of the Line", a song by The Offspring from Americana
 "End of the Line", a song by Overkill from Under the Influence
 "End of the Line", a song by Pain from Rebirth
 "End of the Line", a song by Roxy Music on the 1975 album Siren (Roxy Music album)
 "End of the Line", a song by Status Quo on the 1986 album In the Army Now

Film, television, literature 
 The End of the Line (1957 film), a crime film by Charles Saunders
 End of the Line (1987 film), a drama film by Jay Russell
 End of the Line (2007 film), a horror film by Maurice Devereaux
 The End of the Line (novel), a 2007 young-adult novel by Gary Crew
 The End of the Line: How Overfishing Is Changing the World and What We Eat, a 2004 book by Charles Clover
 The End of the Line (2009 film), a documentary film based on the book by Charles Clover
 End of the Line (Fear the Walking Dead), an episode of the television series Fear the Walking Dead
 "End of the Line", an episode of Digimon Frontier
 "End of the Line", an episode of Godzilla: The Series
 End of the Line (animated short), a 2014 animated short set in the Team Fortress 2 universe

Other uses 
 End-Of-The-Line, a computational problem used in the definition of the complexity class PPAD

See also 
 Newline or end-of-line character, a special character or sequence of characters signifying the end of a line of text
 Finish line (disambiguation)